Mollie Lambert (born 14 June 1998) is an English footballer who currently plays as a central midfielder for Durham in the FA Women's Championship.

Club career

Newcastle United, 2015–2016 
Lambert joined Newcastle United during the club's summer trials in July 2015, beginning her spell at the club in the development side. Joining the club as a striker, she was moved back into central midfield. She stepped up to the first team on 4 October 2015, making her debut as a second half substitute in a 7–2 win against Peterborough Northern Star in the FA Women's National League Plate. She made her full debut in the club's next game, starting in a 0–5 defeat against Preston North End LFC on 25 October 2015. She scored two goals in 21 games in the 2015–16 season.

Lambert was named club captain for the 2016–17 season, first captaining the side against Nottingham Forest on the opening day of the season in August 2016. She scored twice in eight games before November 2016, when she departed to join FA Women's Super League club Sunderland.

Sunderland AFC, 2016–2020 
Lambert returned to Sunderland to play with the development team in 2016. She made her senior debut for the club on 30 April 2017 when she replaced Stephanie Roche in the 71st minute of a 0–0 draw with Arsenal during the FA WSL 1 Spring Series. She made a total of seven out of eight possible appearances during the tournament.

The 2017–18 season was a breakthrough year for the midfielder, playing 17 times in all competitions under Melanie Copeland. Her first goal for Sunderland came in a 13–0 FA Cup fourth round win against Brighouse Town, with Lambert netting a 15 minute hat-trick in the second-half.

Lambert was one of four first team players to remain with the club after their demotion to the third tier FA Women's National League for the 2018–19 season. She scored her first goals of the season on 9 September 2018, in a 3–2 win away to Huddersfield Town, including the late winner.

Durham, 2020–present 
In July 2020, Lambert moved to FA Women's Championship team Durham.

Career Statistics

Club 
.

References 

1998 births
Living people
Footballers from Hartlepool
English women's footballers
Women's association football midfielders
Newcastle United W.F.C. players
Sunderland A.F.C. Ladies players
Durham W.F.C. players
FA Women's National League players